Branislav Vukosavljević (19 September 1929 in Belgrade – 10 November 1985) was a Serbian football midfielder and later a football manager.

On the national level he played for Yugoslavia national team (2 matches) and spent his club career with Red Star Belgrade, Grasshopper Club Zürich and FC Winterthur.

He was top scorer during Grasshopper Club Zürich's double winning season in 1955/56 with 33 goals, scoring six goals in one match.

He then coached FC Winterthur and Grasshopper Club Zürich.

References 

  Serbian national football team website
 Biography at redstarbelgrade.info

1929 births
1985 deaths
Serbian footballers
Yugoslav footballers
Yugoslavia international footballers
FK Radnički Beograd players
Red Star Belgrade footballers
Yugoslav First League players
Grasshopper Club Zürich players
FC Winterthur players
Serbian expatriate footballers
Expatriate footballers in Switzerland
Yugoslav football managers
Serbian football managers
Grasshopper Club Zürich managers
FC Winterthur managers

Association football midfielders